The 49th Man is a 1953 American film noir crime film directed by Fred F. Sears and starring John Ireland and Richard Denning. It was released by Columbia Pictures. The Cold War thriller was based on a story by Ivan Tors and the screenplay written by Harry Essex.

The film's title is a cryptic reference to the men in the film hired to smuggle 48 nuclear weapons components into the United States as part of a secret war game and the unexpected 49th man, using the war game as cover, smuggling in a real atomic bomb as part of a plot to destroy an American city.

Plot
After a fatal car crash in Lordsburg, New Mexico, investigators find a mysterious machine component that they turn over to the nearby Los Alamos National Laboratory for identification. Scientists there declare that it is one component of an advanced portable nuclear weapon designed by an unknown, presumably hostile power. The discovery prompts Paul Reagan (Richard Denning), chief of the Security Investigation Division (SID), to send agent John Williams (John Ireland) to investigate the source of these components and to prevent them from being assembled into a functioning weapon. As more parts are smuggled into the United States, the investigation expands and a pattern begins to emerge which points to Marseilles, France.

After uranium is found welded to the hull of a U.S. Navy submarine in New London, Connecticut, Williams continues his investigation aboard that submarine, now bound for the French port, undercover as a naval officer preparing a training film. While in Marseilles, he learns that civilians Margo Wayne (Suzanne Dalbert) and her husband Leo Wayne (Peter Marshall) are working with clarinet player Buzz Olin (Richard Avonde) and an unknown member of the submarine's crew to smuggle the parts in special metal cases built by Pierre Neff (George Dee). After a fight near the dock, Williams believes that Lt. Magrew (Mike Connors) and Commander Jackson (Robert Foulk) are in on the plot. He orders them arrested, only to be betrayed by his colleague, agent Andy (Robert Hunter), and taken into custody himself.

Arriving in Washington, D.C., Williams escapes from his captors and contacts Reagan at SID headquarters where he finds Jackson and Magrew waiting for him in Reagan's office. The whole exercise was a war game, put on in secret by the Defense Department to test the nation's readiness for a subversive attack. However, the Waynes and Olin are not part of the war game. They have used Neff to construct 4 cases, in addition to the 48 ordered by the naval officers, and smuggled their own portable nuclear weapon into the United States. With less than 48 hours before the bomb's scheduled detonation at 3 p.m. on Tuesday, Williams and his team track Buzz Olin and the Waynes to the San Francisco area. After a desperate attempt to escape with the bomb and destroy San Francisco by air, Leo Wayne is killed and Jackson has just two hours to attempt to defuse the bomb while Williams flies towards Nevada. This fails and with less than a minute to go the bomb is dropped from the plane to detonate over Frenchman Flat at the Nevada Test Site. Crisis averted, the film ends with the narrator intoning, "...and three o'clock is just the middle of another afternoon in the life of a city."

Cast
 John Ireland as SID agent John Williams
 Richard Denning as SID chief Paul Reagan
 Suzanne Dalbert as Margo Wayne
 Robert Foulk as Commander Jackson
 Mike Connors as Ensign Magrew (credited as "Touch Conners")
 Richard Avonde as Buzz Olin
 William Bryant as FBI Agent in Montage (as William R. Klein)
 Cicely Browne as Blonde Woman (as Cicely Brown)
 Tommy Farrell as Agent Reynolds
 Joseph Mell as Box of Taffy Man at Penn Station 
 Robert Hunter as Andy - alias Andre
 Peter Marshall as Leo Wayne

Production
director of photography Lester White, A.S.C.
art director Paul Palmentola
film editor William A. Lyon, A.C.E.
set decorator Louis Diage
assistant director Milton Feldman
sound engineer George Cooper
musical director Mischa Bakaleinikoff
certificate number 16329
Western Electric recording
produced by Sam Katzman
associate producer Charles H. Schneer

References

External links

Review of film at Variety

1953 films
1950s action thriller films
American black-and-white films
American spy films
American crime thriller films
American action thriller films
Cold War spy films
Columbia Pictures films
Films about nuclear war and weapons
Films directed by Fred F. Sears
Films produced by Sam Katzman
Films set in Nevada
Films set in Washington, D.C.
Films set in New Mexico
Films set in Connecticut
Films set in Marseille
Films set in San Francisco
1950s English-language films
1950s American films